Asogli Yam Festival is an annual festival celebrated by the people of Asogli in the Ho Municipality located in the Volta Region of Ghana. It is celebrated in September annually to celebrate the cultivation of yam that was started by a hunter who found the tuber in the forest during his hunting expedition.

According to history, the cultivation of yam among the people of Asogli started when the yam that the hunter hid during his hunting expedition later germinated and grew bigger. The celebration was brought into Ghana by the Ewe people of Ghana when they migrated from Notse in the Republic of Togo, where it is still celebrated.

In 2004, Togbe Aƒede XIV brought back the celebration of the Yam Festival which had been abandoned for over a decade. With the goal of educating and entertaining both Ghanaians and visitors about Asogli traditions, the Yam Festival provides an opportunity for experiencing traditional music, dance, story telling and a grand durbar to end the festival. Togbe Aƒede XIV has provided leadership in uniting many chiefs throughout the Volta Region and extending to other parts of Ghana and Togo. As a result, many of these chiefs attend the Yam Festival.

On 8 May 2018 the Asorgli state in a press conference held in Ho announced a change in the name of the festival to Te Za (Yam Festival) to reflect the history and culture of the people.

The Origin of Yam Cultivation 
Yam is called “ete” in Ewe. The word literally means it is swollen. Oral history has it that a hunter on his normal hunting expedition discovered the crop in the forest. It was during the famine period but instead of taking his newly discovered tuber home, he decided to hide it in the soil for use some other time. When he later went back for it, the tuber had germinated and grown bigger. This was how the cultivation of yam started.

Origin of the Festival 
The celebration of the Yam Festival by Ewes was brought down from Notse in the Republic of Togo where it is still celebrated. Yam cultivation is a very tedious job, and history has it that in those days some people who ventured into it did not live to enjoy the fruits of their labour. It was, and still is, labour-intensive, energy sapping and quite hazardous, hence the proverb “Ne wonye eteti tsogbe wo dua ete la, ne egbor ma kpor etsroa ha du o”. Literally, this means if it were during the day of planting of yam that yam is eaten, the goat would never taste the peel. Diligence was therefore required and the permission and guidance of the gods of the land and the ancestors was sought during the entire period from planting through harvesting.

During the harvest time which is normally in September, the gods and ancestors are served first with the boiled and mashed yam, normally white and red-oiled, called “bakabake”, before any living being tastes it. This rite is called "Dzawuwu". After that, the rest of the mashed yam is eaten as a communal meal, a symbol of unity and reconciliation of families, clans and the entire community.

Objectives of the Celebration 
As a thanksgiving to God, and also to the gods and ancestors for a bumper harvest, and as an occasion to offer prayers for good health and prosperity for all.
To foster unity through forgiveness and reconciliation.
As an annual stocktaking event for all occupational endeavours, especially farming.
To mobilize both human and material resources of Asogli State for job and wealth creation.
To serve as an annual re-affirmation of allegiance by all chiefs and their subjects in the Asogli State to the Agbogbome stool.

References

Continued reading 
Asogli state website article on the Yam Festival.

Festivals in Ghana
 
Food and drink festivals in Ghana
Yam festivals